Gompholobium knightianum is a species of flowering plant in the family Fabaceae and is endemic to the south-west of Western Australia. It is a slender, erect shrub with pinnate leaves, and mostly pink or purple, pea-like flowers.

Description

Taxonomy
Gompholobium knightianum was first formally described in 1831 by John Lindley in Edwards's Botanical Register from specimens grown in the "Mr Knight's Nursery" from seed collected by William Baxter.

Distribution
This pea grows is found in the Avon Wheatbelt, Esperance Plains, Geraldton Sandplains, Jarrah Forest, Mallee, Swan Coastal Plain and Warren biogeographic regions in the south-west of Western Australia.

Conservation status
Gompholobium knightianum is classified as "not threatened" by the Government of Western Australia Department of Parks and Wildlife.

References

knightianum
Eudicots of Western Australia
Plants described in 1831
Taxa named by John Lindley